Katie Magnus, Lady Magnus (née Emanuel; 2 May 1844 – March 1924), was a British author and communal worker. 

A Jew, she was born to E. Emanuel in Portsmouth, and married Sir Philip Magnus. She was a member of various committees of the Berkeley Street Synagogue, engaged in the Jews' Deaf and Dumb Home, and was a treasurer of the Jewish Girls' Club. She wrote several popular books, and also contributed with articles to several periodicals.

She died in London in March 1924.

Works
 Little Miriam's Bible Stories 
 Holiday Stories
 About the Jews Since Bible Times (London, 1881)
 Salvage (1899)
 Outlines of Jewish History (1890)
 Jewish Portraits (1897)
 First Makers of England (London, 1901)
 A Book of Verse (1905)

References

1844 births
1924 deaths
19th-century British writers
British Jewish writers
Wives of baronets
Jewish women writers